Murbad Assembly constituency is one of the 288 Vidhan Sabha (legislative assembly) constituencies of Maharashtra state, western India. This constituency is located in Thane district.

Geographical scope
The constituency comprises Murbad taluka, parts of Kalyan taluka viz. revenue circles of Titwala,
Nadgaon, parts of Ambernath taluka viz. revenue circles Badlapur ,
Goregaon, Kulgaon-Badlapur Municipal Council, parts of Ambernath revenue circle viz. Manjarli and Kharwai Saja.

List of Members of Legislative Assembly

Election results

Assembly Elections 1962

Assembly Elections 1967

Assembly Elections 1972

Assembly Elections 1978

Assembly Elections 1980

Assembly Elections 1985

Assembly Elections 1990

Assembly Elections 1995

Assembly Elections 1999

Assembly Elections 2004

Assembly Elections 2009

Assembly Elections 2014

References

Assembly constituencies of Thane district
Assembly constituencies of Maharashtra